John J. Kennedy is an American political scientist and author. He teaches at West Chester University of Pennsylvania. He is an acknowledged expert on elections.

Kennedy is originally from Catasauqua, Pennsylvania. Kennedy received his Bachelor's degree in Public Administration at Kutztown University in 1984 and his Master in Public Administration from the same institution in 1988. After spending some time at the University of Houston, he earned his Ph.D from Temple University in 1996. Kennedy's dissertation was entitled "The State of the Pennsylvania Legislature in the 1990s."

He joined West Chester University in 1997 as an adjunct professor. His first book, "The Contemporary Pennsylvania Legislature" was published in 1999. This follows his strong interest in statewide politics, which he acknowledges is stronger than the national scene. Kennedy created a Campaigns and Elections class in 2002 in which students represent political candidates and hold a rally and debate. His second book, "Pennsylvania Elections", came out in 2005 and he was made an associate professor the following year. He served as statewide chair of the Association of Pennsylvania State Colleges and University Faculties from 2005 to 2006. Over the years Kennedy has written editorials for The Philadelphia Inquirer and other newspapers and has been interviewed by The Washington Post, Los Angeles Times. PBS and Al-Jazeera. He has conducted several statewide public opinion polls through WCU’s Center for Social and Economic Research, which has developed a reputation as one on the most accurate polling organizations. He argued in a 2014 article that the most important development in Pennsylvania politics has been the dealignment of the Philadelphia suburbs over the decades from solidly Republican to leaning Democratic which hurts Republicans monetarily and politically. In 2015 Kennedy was selected as Keynote speaker for the Undergraduate Research at the Capitol–Pennsylvania (URC-PA) Poster Conference held in Harrisburg. His most recent book, "Pennsylvania Government and Politics" came out in 2017. Kennedy is an advisory board member for "Commonwealth, A Journal of Pennsylvania Policy and Politics."

In December 2017, Kennedy testified as an expert witness for the League of Women Voters in its attempt to invalidate the 2011 electoral map. He explained that how the map changed over time, digging through old maps from the 1960s and argued that it was drawn by Pennsylvania's Republican-majority legislature to heavily favor Republican congressional candidates. As evidence, Kennedy used several complex quantitative analyses. He explained that a single King of Prussia steakhouse was all that connected two parts of the 7th congressional district. Also, he argued that Harrisburg was "cracked" between the fourth and eleventh districts to create Republican majorities in both places. As a result, he was instrumental in the 2018 Supreme Court redistricting in Pennsylvania that drew up all new maps. Kennedy believes that  “communities of interest” should be grouped in the same district and took exception to Allentown and Hershey being in the same district. “Communities are important to our identities as Pennsylvanians. Residents of [Delaware County] have a different identity from residents of Amish Country,” he said. Kennedy held a forum called "Pennsylvania in Disarray: Congressional Redistricting 2018" in April 2018.

He lives in Montgomery County with his wife, Kelli and two children, Clare and Shannon. His wife is a West Chester University graduate.

Bibliography

References

1960s births
Living people
American political scientists
Kutztown University of Pennsylvania alumni
Temple University alumni
West Chester University faculty